Iso-Kiimanen is a lake of Finland in the Oulujoki main catchment area. It is located in Sotkamo municipality in Kainuu region.

See also
List of lakes in Finland

References

Lakes of Sotkamo